Kad fazani lete is the fourth studio album of the rock band Azra, released through Jugoton in 1983. It was recorded in Germany without two original members Mišo Hrnjak and Boris Leiner, who went to serve compulsory military service. Leiner was replaced on drums by Srećko Antonioli, while Štulić played guitar and bass.

In late 1982, Štulić presented his songs to Goran Bregović, who was supposed to produce the new album. However, the collaboration was later cancelled by Štulić.

The album features a different sound of the band, closer to hard rock. Petar Luković, writing for Džuboks in 1983, noted that it "sounded completely different without Leiner and Hrnjak". Štulić described it as "a record for big stages and big concerts".

Kad fazani lete has been described as "the last truly great and significant original long play studio release under the name of Azra".

Track listing
All music and lyrics written by Branimir Štulić.

Personnel 
Azra
Branimir Štulić – Guitars, bass, lead vocals

Additional musicians
Srećko Antonioli – Drums

Artwork
Ivan Ivezić – Design

Production
Branimir Štulić – Producer
Siniša Škarica - Executive producer
Recorded by Peter Siedlaczek

References

 www.discogs.com

Azra albums
1983 albums
Jugoton albums